13241 Biyo, provisional designation , is a background asteroid from the Flora region of the inner asteroid belt, approximately  in diameter. It was discovered on 22 May 1998, by the Lincoln Near-Earth Asteroid Research team (LINEAR) at the U.S. Lincoln Laboratory Experimental Test Site in Socorro, New Mexico. The presumed S-type asteroid has a rotation period of 4.4 hours and likely an elongated shape. It was later named after Filipino educator Josette Biyo.

Orbit and classification 

Biyo is a non-family asteroid of the main belt's background population when applying the hierarchical clustering method to its proper orbital elements. Based on osculating Keplerian orbital elements, the asteroid has also been classified as a member of the Flora family, a giant asteroid clan and the largest family of stony asteroids in the main-belt.

It orbits the Sun in the inner asteroid belt at a distance of 2.1–2.4 AU once every 3 years and 5 months (1,252 days; semi-major axis of 2.27 AU). Its orbit has an eccentricity of 0.06 and an inclination of 7° with respect to the ecliptic.

Naming 

This minor planet was named after Josette Biyo (born 1958), a Filipino educator, former executive director of the Philippine Science High School System and now the director of Department of Science and Technology- Science Education Institute. The naming was part of the International Excellence in Teaching Award she received during the Intel International Science and Engineering Fair held in Louisville, Kentucky, in 2002, when she was a teacher at the Philippine Science High School in Iloilo, Philippines. Biyo was the first Asian teacher to win the Intel Excellence in Teaching Award. The official  was published by the Minor Planet Center on 24 July 2002.

Physical characteristics

Rotation and shape 

In March 2011, a rotational lightcurve of Biyo was obtained from photometric observations by Italian astronomers at the Virginio Cesarini Observatory in Frasso Sabino, Italy. The Italian astronomers also determined a V–R color of 0.38.

Diameter and albedo 

For this asteroid, no observational data has been gathered by the space-based telescopes (IRAS, Akari and WISE) that surveyed large portions of the asteroid belt. The Collaborative Asteroid Lightcurve Link assumes an albedo for a stony asteroid of 0.24 – derived from 8 Flora, the largest member and namesake of the Flora family – and calculates a diameter of 3.92 kilometers with an absolute magnitude of 14.2.

References

External links 
 DOST's 50 great Men And Women Of Science – 8. Josette Biyo, The Manila Times, 2008
 Asteroid Lightcurve Database (LCDB), query form (info )
 Dictionary of Minor Planet Names, Google books
 Discovery Circumstances: Numbered Minor Planets (10001)-(15000) – Minor Planet Center
 
 

 

013241
013241
Named minor planets
19980522